Paul Methuen, 1st Baron Methuen (21 June 1779 – 14 September 1849), was a British Whig politician who was raised to the peerage in 1838.

Biography
Methuen was the son of Paul Cobb Methuen of Corsham, Wiltshire, and his wife Matilda (née Gooch). He sat as Member of Parliament for Wiltshire from 1812 to 1819 and for Wiltshire North from 1833 to 1837. He was appointed High Sheriff of Wiltshire for 1831 and raised in 1838 to the peerage as Baron Methuen, of Corsham in the County of Wiltshire.

Lord Methuen married Jane Dorothea, daughter of Sir Henry Paulet St John-Mildmay, in 1810. She died in 1846. Lord Methuen survived her by three years and died in September 1849, aged 70. He was succeeded in the barony by his son Frederick. His grandson Paul Methuen, 3rd Baron Methuen, became a prominent military commander.

Methuen played in a first-class cricket match in 1816 for Marylebone Cricket Club (MCC) but was dismissed without scoring in both his innings. He was born at Marylebone, London, and died aged 69 at Westminster.

Arms

References

Bibliography
 Kidd, Charles, Williamson, David (editors). Debrett's Peerage and Baronetage (1990 edition). New York: St Martin's Press, 1990, 
 
 
 

Methuen, Paul Methuen, 1st Baron
Methuen, Paul Methuen, 1st Baron
Members of the Parliament of the United Kingdom for Wiltshire
UK MPs 1812–1818
UK MPs 1818–1820
UK MPs 1832–1835
UK MPs 1835–1837
UK MPs who were granted peerages
Whig (British political party) MPs for English constituencies
High Sheriffs of Wiltshire
English cricketers
English cricketers of 1787 to 1825
Marylebone Cricket Club cricketers
Peers of the United Kingdom created by Queen Victoria
Paul 1
Paul